Klodian Xhelilaj (born 23 November 1988, in Vlorë) is an Albanian football player who most recently played as a goalkeeper for Bylis Ballsh in the Albanian First Division.

Honours

Flamurtari 
 Albanian Cup (2): 2008–09, 2013–14
 Kupa Birra Norga (1): 2007
 Kupa Pavarësia (1): 2009
 Kupa Mbarëkombëtare (1): 2009

References

External links
 Profile - FSHF

1988 births
Living people
Footballers from Vlorë
Albanian footballers
Association football goalkeepers
Flamurtari Vlorë players
KF Vlora players
KF Apolonia Fier players
KF Himara players
KF Bylis Ballsh players
Kategoria Superiore players
Kategoria e Parë players